Thomas Knorr (born 16 May 1971) is a German retired handball player. He competed in the men's tournament at the 1996 Summer Olympics.

His son, Juri Knorr is a professional handball player.

Individual awards
 Top Scorer of the European Championship: 1996

References

External links
 

1971 births
Living people
German male handball players
Olympic handball players of Germany
Handball players at the 1996 Summer Olympics
Sportspeople from Lübeck